Trechus bosnicus is a species of ground beetle in the subfamily Trechinae. It was described by Ganglbauer in 1891.

Subspecies 
 Trechus bosnicus bosnicus, Ganglbauer, 1891
 Trechus bosnicus frigidus, Apfelbeck, 1904

References

bosnicus
Beetles described in 1904